Darden is a ghost town in Bowie County, Texas, United States.

History
Darden was originally called Brownstone for Randolph H. Brown and was established on the St. Louis Southwestern Railway in the late 1890s. A post office was established at Darden in 1911 and remained in operation until 1927. Its name was changed to Darden in 1917. There was a store and 10 residents in 1940 with mail being delivered from nearby Bassett. Only scattered dwellings remained in 1984.

Geography
It lies in the low hills of the Sulphur Fork of the Red River of the South.

Education
Darden is located within the Simms Independent School District.

References

Ghost towns in Texas